Curtis Ceaser (born August 11, 1972) is a former American football wide receiver. He played for the New York Jets in 1995.

References

1972 births
Living people
American football wide receivers
Grambling State Tigers football players
New York Jets players